Robert P. Aitken (February 5, 1819 – April 3, 1905) was a Republican politician in the U.S. state of Michigan from 1865 to 1868, a township supervisor, a fire insurance company secretary, and a farmer.

Early life

Aitken was born on February 5, 1819, in what is now Perth, New York to William Aitken and Helen Aitken (née Chalmers), both of whom were born in Scotland. He was raised as an Episcopalian and remained a devout follower of this denomination for his entire life. He was the fifth of six children. As a teenager he worked in his uncle William Hinton's office. In 1842, he moved to Flint Township, Michigan.

Career

Political

In 1865, Aitken was elected to the Michigan House of Representatives for Genesee County's 2nd District, and was re-elected in 1867. 
He also held the office of Supervisor of Flint Township for twenty nine years.

Other

He also acted as secretary of the Genesee County Fire Insurance Company.

Personal life

On March 12, 1843, he married Sarah Johnstone (August 2, 1823 – May 4, 1886).  They had ten children, five sons and five daughters. One of their sons was David D. Aitken (September 5, 1853 – May 26, 1930), also a politician.

Death

Aitken died on April 3, 1905, of unknown causes. He is buried in historic Glenwood Cemetery in Flint, next to his wife and children.

Legacy

Aitken's 1843 Greek Revival/Italianate style farmhouse at 1110 N. Linden Rd. in Flint Township, Michigan was added to The National Register of Historic Places as an example of high-quality 19th century architecture on November 26, 1982. It was later owned by his son David D. Aitken and remains a private residence.

Sources

1819 births
1905 deaths
Republican Party members of the Michigan House of Representatives
People from Fulton County, New York
19th-century American politicians